Snoop Dogg Presents... Doggy Style Allstars, Welcome To Tha House Vol. 1 is a compilation presented by American rapper Snoop Dogg. It was released on August 13, 2002, by Snoop Dogg's own label, Doggystyle Records. The album features production by DJ Premier, Quazedelic, Fredwreck, Meech Wells, The Alchemist, Hi-Tek, and DJ Slip; it was regionally promoted by Radio Bums. It peaked at number 8 on the Billboard Top R&B/Hip-Hop Albums and at number 19 on the Billboard 200. The album features performances by Snoop Dogg, Kokane, RBX, Daz Dillinger, Soopafly, Nate Dogg and The Lady of Rage. 

A DVD titled Snoop Dogg - Welcome to the House: The Doggumentary, featuring music videos for the tracks "Fallen Star" and "Not Like it Was", was released as promotional material for the album.

Reception 

Chart - "Leave it to Snoop to deliver a bumpin' P-Funk beat. In Tha House Vol. 1 is the audio equivalent of his Doggy Style porn series and Hollywood comedies — no convoluted themes, just the down-ass dirty shit that keeps people coming back for more. ... There are no clear highlights, just a steady, slow-burning dose of funky cheeba."

Track listing

Samples
"Dogg House America"
"Oh I" by George Clinton and the Funkadelics
"Hey You!"
"What's Your Name?" by The Moments
"I Just Get Carried Away"
"Do I Stand a Chance" by The Montclairs
"Endo… Light That Shit Up"
"I Need a Bitch" by Nate Dogg (unreleased, later included on Nate Dogg)
"Not Like It Was"
"Telling It Like It Is" by T.U.M.E.

Chart history

References

External links 
 Doggy Style Allstars, Welcome To Tha House Vol. 1 at Discogs
 Doggy Style Allstars, Welcome To Tha House Vol. 1 at MusicBrainz

2002 compilation albums
2002 films
2002 documentary films
Albums produced by the Alchemist (musician)
Albums produced by DJ Premier
Albums produced by DJ Scratch
Albums produced by Fredwreck
Albums produced by Hi-Tek
Albums produced by Nottz
Albums produced by Soopafly
Documentary films about hip hop music and musicians
Gangsta rap compilation albums
Record label compilation albums
Self-released albums
Snoop Dogg compilation albums
Snoop Dogg video albums